Rui Diogo is a researcher, speaker and writer at Howard University with several published scientific books, whose research (including those of his lab ) covers social issues such as racism, sexism, etc., using scientific data from many different fields of science (interdisciplinarity). His studies regarding evolutionary remnants in human babies in the womb has been widely reported.

Education
He obtained his bachelor's degree in biology from the University of Aveiro, Portugal, and later did a PhD in biology at the University of Liege, Belgium, a postdoc at the King's College of London, and then a master's and a Ph.D. at the Department of Anthropology of George Washington University, U.S.A.

Work
He is an associate professor of anatomy, Department of Anatomy, Howard University College of Medicine (US). He was among the most cited/influential anatomists in 2019.

Books

Single author or co-author books
DIOGO, R. (2021). Meaning of Life, Human Nature and Delusions - How Tales about Love, Sex, Races, Gods and Progress Affect Us and Earth's Splendor. Springer (New York, US).
MONTERO, R., ADESOMO, A. & R. DIOGO (2021). On viruses, pandemics, and us: a developing story [De virus, pandemias y nosotros: una historia en desarollo]. Independently published, Tucuman, Argentina. 495 pages.
DIOGO, R., J. ZIERMANN, J. MOLNAR, N. SIOMAVA & V. ABDALA (2018). Muscles of Chordates: development, homologies and evolution. Taylor & Francis (Oxford, UK). 650 pages.
DIOGO, R., B. SHEARER, J. M. POTAU, J. F. PASTOR, F. J. DE PAZ, J. ARIAS-MARTORELL, C. TURCOTTE, A. HAMMOND, E. VEREECKE, M. VANHOOF, S. NAUWELAERTS & B. WOOD (2017). Photographic and descriptive musculoskeletal atlas of bonobos - with notes on the weight, attachments, variations, and innervation of the muscles and comparisons with common chimpanzees and humans. Springer (New York, US). 259 pages.
DIOGO, R. (2017). Evolution driven by organismal behavior: a unifying view of life, function, form, mismatches and trends. Springer (New York, US). 252 pages.
DIOGO, R., D. NODEN, C. M. SMITH, J. A. MOLNAR, J. BOUGHNER, C. BARROCAS & J. BRUNO (2016). Learning and understanding human anatomy and pathology: an evolutionary and developmental guide for medical students. Taylor & Francis (Oxford, UK). 348 pages. 
SMITH, C. M., J. M. ZIERMANN, J. A. MOLNAR, M. C. GONDRE-LEWIS, C. SANDONE, E. T. BERSU, M. A. AZIZ & R. DIOGO (2015). Muscular and skeletal anomalies in human trisomy in an evo-devo context: description of a T18 cyclopic newborn and comparison between Edwards (T18), Patau (T13) and Down (T21) syndromes using 3-D imaging and anatomical illustrations. Taylor & Francis (Oxford, UK). 217 pages.
DIOGO, R., J.F. PASTOR, A. HARTSTONE-ROSE & M. N. MUCHLINSKI (2014). Baby gorilla: Photographic and descriptive atlas of the skeleton, muscles and internal organs - including CT scans and comparisons to other gorillas and primates. Taylor & Francis (Oxford, UK). 101 pages.
DIOGO, R., J.M. POTAU, J.F. PASTOR, F. de PAZ, M.M. BARBOSA, E.M. FERRERO, G. BELLO, B.A. WOOD & M. A. AZIZ (2013). "Photographic and descriptive atlas of chimpanzees (Pan) - with notes on the attachments, variations, innervation, function, synonymy and weight of the muscles". Taylor & Francis (Oxford, UK). 149 pages.
DIOGO, R., J.M. POTAU, J.F. PASTOR, F. de PAZ, M.M. BARBOSA, E.M. FERRERO, G. BELLO, B.A. WOOD & M. A. AZIZ (2013). "Photographic and descriptive atlas of orangutans (Pongo) - with notes on the attachments, variations, innervation, synonymy and weight of the muscles". Taylor & Francis (Oxford, UK). 150 pages.
DIOGO, R. & WOOD, B. (2012). "Comparative anatomy and phylogeny of primate muscles and human evolution". Taylor & Francis (Oxford, UK). 1025 pages.
DIOGO, R., J.M. POTAU, J.F. PASTOR, F. de PAZ, M.M. BARBOSA, E.M. FERRERO, G. BELLO, B.A. WOOD, A. BURROWS & M. A. AZIZ (2012). "Photographic and descriptive atlas of gibbons and siamangs (Hylobates) - with notes on the attachments, variations, innervation, synonymy and weight of the muscles". Taylor & Francis (Oxford, UK). 168 pages.
DIOGO, R. & V. ABDALA (2010). "Muscles of Vertebrates: comparative anatomy, evolution, homologies and development". Taylor & Francis (Oxford, UK). 476 pages.
DIOGO, R., J.M. POTAU, J.F. PASTOR, F. de PAZ, M.M. BARBOSA, E.M. FERRERO, G. BELLO & B.A. WOOD (2010). "Photographic and descriptive atlas of Gorilla - with notes on the attachments, variations, innervation, synonymy and weight of the muscles". Taylor & Francis (Oxford, UK). 132 pages.
DIOGO, R. (2007). "Origin and evolution of higher clades: osteology, myology, phylogeny and macroevolution of bony fishes and the rise of tetrapods". Science Publishers (Enfield, US). 367 pages.
DIOGO, R. (2004). "Morphological evolution, Aptations, Homoplasies, Constraints, and Evolutionary trends: catfishes as a case study on general phylogeny and macroevolution". Science Publishers (Enfield, US). 491 pages.

Edited works
VERACINI, C., B. WOOD & R. DIOGO (in preparation). "Encounters between humans and other primates - history, myth, art, science and our place in nature". Science Publishers and Taylor & Francis (Oxford, UK). 
ZIERMANN, J. M., R. DIAZ & R. DIOGO (2019). "Heads, jaws and muscles: anatomical, functional, and developmental diversity in Chordate evolution". Springer (New York, US). 303 pages.
GRANDE, T., F. POYATO-ARIZA & R. DIOGO (2009). "Gonorynchiformes and ostariophysan interrelationships – a comprehensive review". Science Publishers and Taylor & Francis (Oxford, UK). 592 pages.
ARRATIA, G., B.G. KAPOOR, M. CHARDON & R. DIOGO (2003). "Catfishes". Science Publishers (Enfield, US). 812 pages.

References

External links
Rui Diogo Research Lab website
Researchgate Profile
Rui Diogo Nature Profile
Rui Diogo Amazon Author Profile
Howard Anatomy Faculty Profiles, including Rui Diogo

Living people
Year of birth missing (living people)